Logan station is a SEPTA subway stop on the Broad Street subway in the Logan neighborhood of North Philadelphia, Pennsylvania. It is located at 5100 North Broad Street at Lindley Avenue.  This is a local station, and thus has four tracks, with only the outer two being served. There are separate fare control areas for the northbound and southbound platforms, and no crossover exists.

Logan station is located on Broad Street beneath a bridge for what is today the SEPTA Main Line that carries the Fox Chase, Lansdale/Doylestown, Warminster, and West Trenton Line. No connection to any of these railroad lines exists at this station.

Station layout

Gallery

References

External links 

SEPTA Broad Street Line stations
Railway stations in the United States opened in 1928
Railway stations in Philadelphia
Railway stations located underground in Pennsylvania
1928 establishments in Pennsylvania